The , "armor piercer" or "mail piercer", is one of the traditionally made Japanese swords (nihontō) that were worn by the samurai class as a weapon in feudal Japan.

Description
The yoroi-dōshi is an extra thick tantō, a short sword, which appeared in the Sengoku period (late Muromachi) of the 14th and 15th centuries. The yoroi-dōshi was made for piercing armour and for stabbing while grappling in close quarters.  The weapon ranged in size from 20 cm to 22 cm, but some examples could be under 15 cm, with a "tapering mihaba, iori-mune, thick kasane at the top, and thin kasane at the bottom and occasionally moroha-zukuri construction". The motogasane (blade thickness) at the munemachi (the notch at the beginning of the back edge of the blade) can be up to a centimeter thick, which is characteristic of the yoroi-dōshi.  The extra thickness at the spine of the blade distinguishes the yoroi-dōshi from a standard tantō blade.

Yoroi-dōshi were worn inside the belt on the back or on the right side with the hilt toward the front and the edge upward.

Gallery

See also
 Japanese sword
 Otoya Yamaguchi – assassin of Inejirō Asanuma
 Tantō – Japanese dagger, the shorter sword in a daishō 
 Wakizashi – Japanese dagger, sometimes the shorter sword in a daishō
 Dagger – other short fighting blades
 Rondel dagger – Medieval western European
 Anelace – Medieval western European
 Misericorde – Medieval western European
 Bollock dagger – Medieval western European
 Baselard – Medieval western European
Stiletto – Renaissance western European
 Dirk – Early Modern western European
 Combat knife – modern military fighting blades

Notes

References

External links

 Nihontō message board forum
 Richard Stein's Japanese sword guide

Japanese sword types
Samurai swords